Henrikus Tromp (19 March 1878 in Tandjoeng Poera, Dutch East Indies – 17 April 1962 in Etterbeek, Belgium) was a Dutch rower who competed in the 1900 Summer Olympics. He legally changed his name to Henrikus Van Hettinga Tromp in 1925.

He was part of the Dutch boat Minerva Amsterdam, which won the bronze medal in the eight event.

References

External links

 profile

1878 births
1962 deaths
Dutch male rowers
Olympic rowers of the Netherlands
Rowers at the 1900 Summer Olympics
Olympic bronze medalists for the Netherlands
Olympic medalists in rowing
People from Langkat Regency
Medalists at the 1900 Summer Olympics
Dutch people of the Dutch East Indies